Craig Alcock (born 8 December 1987) is an English former professional footballer who played as a defender. Having begun his career at Yeovil Town he spent time on loan at Weston-super-Mare, Taunton Town and Tiverton Town before moving to Peterborough United. Alcock then played for Sheffield United, Doncaster Rovers and Cheltenham Town. Following a return to Yeovil Town and a stint at Harlow Town, he retired from playing in 2022. Alcock is a U16s coach at Luton Town.

Career

Yeovil Town
Born in Truro, Cornwall, Alcock started his career with the Yeovil Town youth system in 2004. At the start of the 2005–06 season Alcock was awarded a first team contract along with fellow youth teammates Tom Clarke and Jake Smeeton. Due to being over-age for playing in the youth side for Yeovil Town, he had three short-term loan spells in the 2006–07 season with Conference South side Weston-super-mare, Southern League sides Taunton Town and Tiverton Town. He made his first team debut as a substitute away at Gillingham in the final league match of the 2006–07 season.

After making a breakthrough and challenging for the number one right back slot in the 2007–08 season, Alcock became a regular starter during the 2008–09 season due to injuries and suspensions concerning Lee Peltier. In February 2008 Alcock had to play in goal after an injury to Steve Mildenhall against Walsall; he came on at 0-0 but Yeovil ended up losing 2–0. In May 2009, Alcock signed a new 2-year contract with Yeovil Town, and after new captain Stefan Stam was dropped due to injury and poor form, Alcock was made captain for the remainder of the season.

In early summer 2010, Alcock was linked with a move to championship side Norwich City but remained with Yeovil for the remainder of the season and in May 2011 was informed by the club that he was one of seven Yeovil players who would be awarded new contracts.

Peterborough United
Despite being offered a new deal at Yeovil, in July 2011 Alcock signed for Peterborough United on a three-year deal with Yeovil receiving £100,000 in compensation due to his age. Alcock made 112 appearances for Posh in all competitions over his three seasons at the club, including winning the EFL Trophy in 2014, before being released at the end of the 2013–14 season.

Sheffield United
In July 2014, Alcock signed a two-year deal with Sheffield United. Alcock started as a regular in the side both at centre half and then in his more customary role at right back. However, after an injury he has found himself in a more peripheral role, made harder by the January arrivals of additional full backs Kieron Freeman and John Brayford. In his second season at United, Alcock again found match time hard to come by, and as a result joined fellow League One side Doncaster Rovers on a 28-day loan on 10 November 2015. The loan was made permanent on 7 January 2016.

Cheltenham Town
On 7 August 2018, Cheltenham Town signed the now free agent Alcock on a free transfer. On 26 January 2019, Alcock was released by Cheltenham.

Yeovil Town
On 1 February 2019, following his release from Cheltenham, Alcock re-signed for Yeovil Town on a contract until the end of the 2018–19 season.

Personal life
Alcock is also a keen cricketer playing for Wincanton CC in the Somerset League. Alcock studied for his A-Levels at Sexey's School in Bruton, Somerset.

Career statistics

Honours
Peterborough United
EFL Trophy: 2013–14

Individual
Doncaster Rovers Player of the Year: 2015–16

References

External links

1987 births
Living people
Sportspeople from Truro
English footballers
Association football defenders
Yeovil Town F.C. players
Tiverton Town F.C. players
Taunton Town F.C. players
Weston-super-Mare A.F.C. players
Peterborough United F.C. players
Sheffield United F.C. players
Doncaster Rovers F.C. players
Cheltenham Town F.C. players
Harlow Town F.C. players
English Football League players
National League (English football) players
Isthmian League players
Southern Football League players
People educated at Sexey's School